David Fiuczynski (born March 5, 1964) is an American contemporary jazz guitarist, best known as the leader of the Screaming Headless Torsos and David Fiuczynski's KiF, and as a member of Hasidic New Wave. He has played on more than 95 albums as a session musician, band leader, or band member.

Though born in the United States, his family moved to Germany when he was 8 years old and remained until he was 19. He returned to the US to study at Hampshire College and later the prestigious New England Conservatory. He received a Bachelor of Music from the latter in 1989. After living in New York City for more than a decade, he now resides in Massachusetts and is a professor at the Berklee College of Music in Boston.

Fiuczynski describes himself as "a jazz musician who doesn't want to play just jazz." Many of his albums have thematic material associated with one or more additional genres. For example, Screaming Headless Torsos emphasizes jazz-funk fusion; and Hasidic New Wave blends jazz with Semitic and African music. His album Jazz Punk is a collection of standards and covers written by his idols and mentors where each tune was reworked in distinctive musical combinations.

In 2005, Fiuczynski was hired by former Police drummer Stewart Copeland for the band Gizmo, which toured in Italy in July 2005. Starting in 2007, he has toured with trumpeter Cuong Vu and with jazz pianist Hiromi Uehara, ano appeared on the latter's albums Time Control and Beyond Standard.

In 2012 he started Planet MicroJam, an institute exploring the use of microtones in jazz, ethnic folk and other contexts.

Fiuczynski is the guitarist on the 2013 album Gamak by alto saxophonist Rudresh Mahanthappa.

Discography

As leader or co-leader
 1991 Trio + Two with  Cindy Blackman, Santi Debriano (Freelance)
 1994 Lunar Crush with John Medeski (Gramavision)
 2000 Jazz Punk (Fuzelicious Morsels)
 2002 Black Cherry Acid Lab (Fuzelicious Morsels)
 2003 Kif with Rufus Cappadocia (Fuzelicious Morsels)
 2005 Boston T Party with Dennis Chambers, Jeff Berlin, T Lavitz (Mascot)
 2008 Kif Express (Fuzelicious Morsels)
 2012 Planet Microjam (RareNoise)
 2016 Flim! Blam! (RareNoise)

With Hasidic New Wave
 1997 Jews and the Abstract Truth
 1998 Psycho-Semitic
 1999 Kabalogy
 2001 From the Belly of Abraham

With Screaming Headless Torsos
 1995 Screaming Headless Torsos
 2000 Live in NYC
 2001 Live!!
 2002 1995
 2005 2005
 2014 Code Red

As co-leader
With  
 Mikrojazz! (2017)

As sideman
With Hiromi
 2003 Another Mind
 2007 Time Control
 2008 Beyond Standard
 2009 Live in Concert

With others
 1989 London Concert Vols. 1 & 2, George Russell
 1989 Soldiers of Fortune, Santi Debriano
 1991 Blu Blu Blu, Muhal Richard Abrams
 1992 Duophonic, Charles & Eddie
 1992 Serious Hang, Jack Walrath
 1993 Plantation Lullabies, Meshell Ndegeocello
 1993 Amethyst, Billy Hart
 1993 Raven Roc, Ronald Shannon Jackson
 1994 Thought 'Ya Knew, CeCe Peniston
 1995 Chartbusters!, The Chartbusters
 1996 Peace Beyond Passion, Meshell Ndegeocello
 1996 Big Music, Mike Gibbs
 1996 Hip Strut, Bop City
 1997 Oceans of Time, Billy Hart
 1998 Mind over Matter, Mark Shim
 2000 Cycles, Gene Lake
 2001 Cherry, Josh Roseman
 2001 Conjunction, Mike Clark
 2001 I'll Be Fine, Janita
 2001 Venus in Transit, Franz Koglmann
 2002 Scientist at Work, Frank London
 2003 East Village Sessions, Gongzilla
 2003 President Alien, Yerba Buena
 2003 Yol Bolsin, Sevara Nazarkhan
 2005 Siete Rayo, Descemer Bueno
 2009 More to Say...Real Life Story, Terri Lyne Carrington
 2013 Gamak, Rudresh Mahanthappa
 2015 Wandering Music, Billy Martin

References

External links 
 Official site
 Interview from 2000

1964 births
Living people
Musicians from Newark, New Jersey
Avant-garde jazz musicians
Jazz fusion musicians
20th-century American guitarists
21st-century American guitarists
American jazz guitarists
Berklee College of Music faculty
Guitarists from New Jersey
American male guitarists
20th-century American male musicians
21st-century American male musicians
American male jazz musicians
The Jazz Passengers members
Screaming Headless Torsos members
Hasidic New Wave members
RareNoiseRecords artists
Gramavision Records artists